The 1993–94 UMass Minutemen basketball team represented the University of Massachusetts Amherst during the 1993–94 NCAA Division I men's basketball season. The Minutemen, led by sixth year head coach John Calipari, played their home games at William D. Mullins Memorial Center and were members of the Atlantic 10 Conference. They finished the season 28-7, 14-2 in A-10 play to finish in first place.

Roster

Schedule

|-
!colspan=9| Regular season

|-
!colspan=8| 1994 Atlantic 10 men's basketball tournament

|-
!colspan=8| 1994 NCAA Division I men's basketball tournament

Rankings

References

UMass Minutemen basketball seasons
UMass
UMass